Damien Mealey is an Australian cricketer and umpire.

He was the umpire for the Matador BBQs One-Day Cup match played between the CA XI and South Australia.

References

External links

1968 births
Living people
Australian cricket umpires